Geraldine Thomson Mucha (5 July 1917 – 12 October 2012) was a Scottish composer.

She was born in London and studied at the Royal Academy of Music. She married the Czech writer Jiří Mucha, son of the painter Alphonse Mucha, and in 1945 moved to Prague. She lived there for the greater part of the next sixty years.

Early life and education 
Geraldine Mucha was born in London on 5 July 1917. She was the only child of Marcus Thomson (sometimes spelled Thomsen) who came from Glasgow and of Maisie Evans, a New Zealander. Marcus Thomson studied at the Royal Academy of Music (R.A.M.) in London between 1902 and 1906 and became a successful baritone singer. In 1920 he was appointed as a Singing Professor at the R.A.M. where he remained on the staff until the 1950s. Maisie Evans studied music in Leipzig and during the First World War appeared in a leading role in the long running musical success Chu Chin Chow (His Majesty's Theatre, London, 1916) and later on in Nigel Playfair’s famous production of The Beggar’s Opera (Lyric Theatre, Hammersmith, 1920).

Mucha herself showed an interest in music from a very early age and her father, impressed by her improvisations at the piano, taught her to read and write music before she went to school. Between 1929 and 1934 Mucha attended Frognall School; a private establishment in North London much favoured by actors and musicians for their daughters‘ education. It was here that she became friends with Maeve Bax, daughter of the well known composer Arnold Bax (1885–1953). His interest was caught by Mucha's musical talent and he played through her early works and gave her advice. She also took lessons in harmony with her father's colleague, the composer Benjamin Dale (1885–1943). She was a keen concert–goer and often attended the opera with her mother and developed a passion for the ballet.

In the autumn term of 1935 Mucha became a student at the Royal Academy of Music, where she was awarded several scholarships. Her first study was Piano and her second Composition. For this she once more received tuition from Dale and also William Alwyn (1905–1985), Alan Bush (1900–1995) and Harry Farjeon (1878–1948).

Whilst a student Mucha composed the ballet Nausicaa which was given in a performance for two pianos at a student concert. Constant Lambert (1905–1951), musical director for the Sadler's Wells Ballet, was impressed when he was shown the score but was apparently sceptical that a woman could have written it. In her final year as a student Mucha had a piano quartet, Halingdal, performed by the Philharmonic Quartet at the prestigious Wigmore Hall in London. This was subsequently published by Boosey and Hawkes.

Mucha graduated from the Academy in the summer of 1943.

Marriage and emigration 
In the spring of 1941, whilst attending a party in Leamington Spa, Geraldine met the young Czech writer Jiří Mucha. They were married in London in 1942. While her new husband was abroad, working as a war correspondent, Geraldine served as a telephone switchboard operator. She also made musical arrangements for the BBC. Shortly after the war in Europe was over, the couple set off for Prague, the city that was to become their main home for the rest of their lives. Here Geraldine Mucha became involved in the creation of the early Prague Spring music festivals. Their only child, John, was born in 1948. In 1950 Jiří was arrested by the Communists for his wartime collaboration with the Allies. He was gaoled and not released until 1953. During this time Geraldine lived on a small holding in the Czech countryside and served as organist at the village church. After Jiří Mucha's release he was gradually able to resume his writing career and Geraldine had occasional work as a music editor for the publishers Melantrich. She became a member of the Czechoslovak Composers Union and her compositions were given public performances and recordings by professional orchestras.

Beginning in the early 1960s the Muchas were closely involved in the international resurgence of interest in the Art Nouveau designs of Jiří's father, Alphonse. In order to make it easier to arrange exhibitions beyond the Iron Curtain, Geraldine returned to live in Scotland so that when her husband was able to obtain permission for “marital visits” they could, in fact, tour the world supervising the growing number of exhibitions.

Jiří Mucha died in 1991, just after the communist government collapsed, and consequently Geraldine returned to Prague for the remainder of her life; although she continued to spend every summer at her house in Scotland, not far from Aberdeen.

With her son John and the newly created Mucha Foundation, Geraldine continued to act as an enthusiastic ambassador for the artistic legacy of her father-in-law. Nevertheless, she continued writing music until the very end of her life. In her later years there was a revival of interest in her chamber music, especially amongst Prague's professional musicians, and new works were commissioned and performed. Her orchestral works were, however, almost entirely forgotten.

Geraldine Mucha died at her home in Prague on 12 October 2012. Only two weeks earlier she had attended a concert of her music given in the Prague Conservatory of Music to celebrate her 95th birthday.

She is buried together with her husband in Prague's Vyšehrad Cemetery.

Music 
Mucha was fortunate to be encouraged as a composer from an unusually early age. Before beginning her formal studies at the Royal Academy of Music she had already been privately tutored by the composer Benjamin Dale and had had her teenage compositions overseen by Arnold Bax, one of the most well known British composers of his day. So she was already familiar with the late Romantic musical style of these two influential figures.

On entering the R.A.M. she was taught by two notable young composers, Alwyn and Bush. Their more astringent, post–romantic style undoubtedly coloured Mucha's own manner of writing. But with her deep love of Scottish folk music, which she often quoted in her works, she remained closer to the interests of older composers, such as Ralph Vaughan Williams (1872–1958) or Béla Bartok (1881–1945) who she particularly admired. Igor Stravinsky was another “modern” whose music held a great fascination for her and she was endlessly interested in how composers constructed and scored their works.

Mucha's first encounter with Czech music had been shortly before the Second World War when she had heard the young prodigy Vitěslava Kapralová (b. 1915) conducting her own music in a concert in London (Kapralová was to become Jiří Mucha's first wife until her early death in 1940). She also heard pieces by Janáček and Martinů conducted in wartime performances by the Czech émigré Vilém Tausky (1910–2004). Having arrived in Prague, Mucha hoped to take lessons with Vitězslav Novák (1870–1949), a distinguished composer with a definite late-Romantic approach to music. This did not happen, but in her own music Mucha continued to seek to blend her personal romantic spirit with a more modern, mid-twentieth century sound. In this she shared a similarity with her Czech contemporaries Petr Eben (1929–2007) and Luboš Fišer (1935–1999).

Recordings
 'Macbeth and Other Orchestral Works': Tempest Overture, Macbeth Suite, Songs of John Webster, Piano Concerto, Sixteen Variations on an Old Scottish Song
 'Chamber music': String Quartets 1 and 2, Variations on an Old Scottish Song, Naše cesta, For Erika, Wind Quintet, Epitaph (In Memory of Jiří Mucha

Works
Selected works include:
Nausica, ballet, 1942
Macbeth, ballet, 1965
Fantasy, 1946
Pictures from Sumava symphonic suite, 1952
Piano Concerto, 1960
Carmina Orcadiana, 1960?
The Tempest overture for orchestra, 1964
String quartets, 1941, 1962 (discarded), 1988
Parting and Teasing, for piano 1942
Sonatina for Viola, 1945
Sonatas for violin and piano, 1947, 1961
Piano pieces for children, 1953
16 Variations on a Scottish Folksong, for piano 1957
Sea Scenes, for violin and piano 1958
Nonet, 1959, 1982
Sonnets from Shakespeare for speaker, flute, and harp, 1961
Song of Songs for speaker, flute, and harp, 1963
Serenade for wind quintet, 1964
Intermezzo for English horn and strings, 1988
Music for harp and piano, 1990
Epitaph (in memory of Jiri Mucha), for string quintet and oboe, 1991
Piano Trio, 1995
Collection of Czech and Slovak songs for baritone and piano, 1943
Folk Lullabies, 1952
Two Choruses for women's voices, 1956–1958
Incantation for baritone and orchestra on lyrics by Byron, 1960
En Los Pinares de Jucar for soprano, oboe d'amore and strings, 1975
3 Jersey Folksongs, for soprano, baritone, and piano, 1975
3 Winter Songs for soprano, baritone, and piano, 1975
John Webster Songs for soprano and orchestra (also a version for oboe d'amore, harpsichord, and for piano, 1975–1988
5 canciones de Antonio Machado for soprano and 7 solo instruments, 1980s
Sonnets of Hawthornden for soprano, oboe, and string quintet, 1990
Epitaph for oboe and string quintet, 1991

References

External links
 .
 .
 .
 .

1917 births
2012 deaths
20th-century classical composers
21st-century classical composers
Alumni of the Royal Academy of Music
British emigrants to Czechoslovakia
British music educators
Women classical composers
Musicians from London
Scottish classical composers
20th-century English composers
20th-century Scottish musicians
20th-century English women musicians
21st-century English women musicians
Women music educators
20th-century women composers
21st-century women composers